Babruvahana is a 1964 Indian Telugu-language Hindu mythological film, produced by C. Jaganmohana Rao under the Sri National Art Pictures banner and directed by Samudrala Sr. It stars N. T. Rama Rao, S. Varalakshmi and Chalam, with music composed by Paamarthi. The film is based on the life of Babruvahana, one of the sons of Arjuna.

Plot
The film begins during the time of Dvapara Yuga when Arjuna (N. T. Rama Rao) was making an around-the-earth trip for one year, gets acquainted with many ladies and marries them, such as Ulupi (Rajasulochana), daughter of Nagaraja Kouravya (C.S.R), Chitrangada (S. Varalakshmi), daughter of Vichitra Vahana (Relangi), King of Manipura and finally Subhadra (L. Vijayalakshmi), sister of Lord Krishna (Kanta Rao). Chitangada gives birth to a baby boy Babruvahana (Chalam). Time passes, Babruvahana becomes king of Manipura. After completion of the Kurukshetra War, Dharma Raja (Mikkilineni) performs Ashwamedha Yaaga by sending Arjuna (N. T. Rama Rao) as a guardian for Yaagaswa the horse. Meanwhile, Ulupi learns that Goddess Ganga gave a curse to Arjuna during the time of war to go to hell for the injustice he had done for Bhishma. Ulupi prays to Ganga for removing the curse and she repents that if Arjuna dies in the hands of any relative, he gets rid of the curse. Then she also procures a weapon for Arjuna's death. Ulupi reaches Manipura trains Babruvahana and gifts him the weapon. After crossing many kingdoms, Arjuna reaches Manipura, when Ulupi instigates Babruvahana to catch the horse and he obliges her. Here the conflict arises between father & son. Chitrangada tries to compromise, but fails, the war begins and Arjuna dies. Seeing this, Babruvahana's heart breaks and he blames Ulupi when she reveals the truth and suggests the way to make him alive. She asks Babruvahana to get Nagamani from Nagaloka and after facing many obstacles, Babruvahana makes Arjuna alive with the blessing of Lord Krishna.

Cast
N. T. Rama Rao as Arjuna
S. Varalakshmi as Chitrangada
Chalam as Babruvahana
Kanta Rao as Lord Krishna
Relangi as Vichitra Vaahana Maharaju
M. Balaiah as Balarama
Mikkilineni as Dharma Raja
Mukkamala
C.S.R. as Nagaraja Kouravya
Vangara
Peketi Sivaram
Raja Sulochana as Ulupi
L. Vijayalakshmi as Subhadra 
Geetanjali

Soundtrack

Music composed by Paamarthi. Lyrics were written by Samudrala Sr. Music released by AVM Audio Company.

References

External links
 

Films based on the Mahabharata